Clarence Vaughn (born July 17, 1964) is a former American football safety in the National Football League (NFL) for the Washington Redskins.

High school years
In high school, at Gage Park in Chicago, Vaughn played football, basketball and baseball.  He was All-State honorable mention and a three-year football letterman starting on both sides of the ball as a running back and a linebacker.

College career
Vaughn played college football at Northern Illinois University where he won his 4-year football scholarship.  He played linebacker for the Huskies and led the team in tackles with 92 tackles his senior year. In 1983, he was a linebacker on the California Bowl III championship team where they beat CSUF.  Vaughn played under three head coaches at Northern Illinois University, Bill Mallory, Lee Corso and Jerry Pettibone.  In 1995, he was inducted into the NIU Hall of Fame for the 1983 football team. He received his B.A. Degree in Criminal Justice and minored in Business Administration.

Professional career
Vaughn was drafted in the eighth round (219th overall) of the 1987 NFL Draft by the Washington Redskins.  In his first NFL start against the St. Louis Cardinals, he had 13 solo tackles.  Later that year, in a post-season game against the Minnesota Vikings, Vaughn made a critical play where he sacked Vikings quarterback Wade Wilson.  They then went on to win Super Bowl XXII against the Denver Broncos.  He won his second Super Bowl in 1992 against the Buffalo Bills, Super Bowl XXVI. Vaughn was the first NIU player to play in a Super Bowl, and is still the only NIU player to win two Super Bowls.

After football
Vaughn currently runs a youth and young adult football training camp called Get NFL Ready and was Assistant Coach at Loudoun Valley High School in 2015.  Prior to the 2015 football season, he was the head coach of Liberty High School in Colorado Springs, Colorado. In 2010, Vaughn coached with the Washington Redskins under their internship program.  With the Redskins, Vaughn studied the defensive plays, helped manage the sideline reps and helped manage game day performance of the defensive players. Vaughn coached his third season in 2009 at Bluffton University as a defensive assistant under the NFLPA/NCAA program for retired players.  In 2007-08, in Colorado, he was an assistant football coach in charge of the middle linebackers for Rampart High School.  He was the fourth Super Bowl vet ever to coach high school in Colorado (John Elway with Cherry Creek, Louis Wright with Rangeview and Rick Upchurch with Pueblo East are the other three).  Vaughn is married to his wife, Brooke, and resides in Northern Virginia with their kids.

References

External links

 Clarence Vaughn regular season stats
 Clarence Vaughn Website
 get NFL Ready with Clarence Vaughn
 Redskins Alumni Network created by Clarence Vaughn

1964 births
Living people
American football defensive backs
Northern Illinois Huskies football players
Players of American football from Chicago
Sportspeople from Chicago
Washington Redskins coaches
Washington Redskins players